The Federation of Jewish Communities of Russia (FJCR;) is a Russian religious organization that unifies communities of Orthodox Judaism, mostly of Chabad Hassidic movement. It was registered by the Russian Ministry of Justice in 1999.

Administration 
Group leadership:
 Chairman of Council of Rabbis — Berel Lazar;
 Chairman of Executive Board — Alexander Boroda
 Chairman of Board of Trustees  — Roman Abramovich
 Chairman of Public Council — Joseph Kobzon
 Head of Council Chairman — Mark Grubarg

Activities
The group maintains a department of legal defense against antisemitism.

As of 2007, FJCR was active in 200 communities in 178 cities, with rabbis in 42 communities. It operates Sunday schools in 73 Russian cities, and 41 synagogues, among other facilities.

See also
Antisemitism in Russia
Israel-Russia relations
Russian Jewish Congress

References

External links
Official site of FJCR

Jewish organizations based in Russia
Chabad organizations
Jewish